Freedom is the sixth album by the Christian rock band White Heart and the last of the band's albums with Sparrow Records. Produced by Brown Bannister, it was also the last album for Tommy Sims, Gordon Kennedy and Chris McHugh, although McHugh returned as a session musician for Tales of Wonder (1992). With Bannister at the production helm and he is best known for producing Amy Grant's albums, he allowed the group to stretch musically and lyrically. It is considered one of White Heart's best albums in Christian rock with both Christian rock and Christian radio (AC/CHR) giving airplay on songs like "Over Me," "Invitation," "The River Will Flow," "Let the Kingdom Come" and "Eighth Wonder." Freedom peaked at number 2 on the Billboard Top Inspirational Albums chart.

Track listing
 "Bye Bye Babylon" (Rick Florian, Mark Gersmehl, Gordon Kennedy, Tommy Sims, Billy Smiley) – 4:09 
 "Sing Your Freedom" (Gersmehl, Kennedy, Sims, Smiley) – 4:53
 "Let the Kingdom Come" (Gersmehl, Kennedy, Sims, Smiley) – 5:03	
 "Over Me" (Gersmehl, Kennedy, Sims, Smiley, Chris McHugh) – 5:15
 "Eighth Wonder" (Florian, Gersmehl, Kennedy, McHugh, Smiley) – 4:18
 "Power Tools" (Kennedy, McHugh, Smiley) – 4:21
 "Invitation" (Kennedy, Sims) – 4:52
 "The River Will Flow" (Gersmehl, Smiley) – 6:52 
 "Set The Bridge On Fire" (Florian, Gersmehl, Kennedy, Smiley) – 4:33 (CD version only)
 "Let It Go" (Gersmehl, Kennedy, Sims, Smiley) – 4:11
 "I'll Meet You There" (Gersmehl, Sims) – 4:18

Critical reception 
AllMusic's Brian Mansfield believes that White Heart "took the album's name to heart, allowing themselves more creative leeway on this than on any previous album. Most Christian arena rock sounds derivative of its secular counterparts -- not 'Freedom;' even its weak spots are undeniably original."

Personnel 

White Heart
 Rick Florian – lead vocals (1–7, 9, 10, 11), backing vocals 
 Mark Gersmehl – keyboards, backing vocals, 1st lead vocal (3), lead vocals (8)
 Billy Smiley – guitars, backing vocals
 Gordon Kennedy – guitars, backing vocals, 2nd lead vocal (4), 3rd lead vocal (7)
 Tommy Sims – bass, backing vocals, 1st lead vocal (7)
 Chris McHugh – drums, backing vocals

Additional musicians
 Tommy Dorsey – additional keyboards (3)
 Chris Rodriguez – backing vocals (2, 3, 6)
 Stan Armor – backing vocals (8)
 Margaret Becker – backing vocals (8)
 Steven Curtis Chapman – backing vocals (8)
 Eddie DeGarmo – backing vocals (8)
 Dave Perkins – harmony vocals (8)

Production 

 Peter York – executive producer 
 Brown Bannister – producer
 Jeff Balding – recording, mixing 
 Byron House – additional engineer
 Steve Bishir – assistant engineer
 Shawn McLean – assistant engineer
 Paula Montondo – assistant engineer
 Todd Moore – assistant engineer
 Mark Nevers – assistant engineer
 Carry Summers – assistant engineer
 Kevin Twit – assistant engineer
 Bob Ludwig – mastering at Masterdisk, New York
 Barbara Catanzaro-Hearn – art direction 
 Larry Virgin – art direction, design
 Mark Tucker – photography 
 The Bennett House – recording location
 The Castle, Franklin, Tennessee – recording location
 Digital Recorders, Nashville, Tennessee – recording location
 OmniSound Studios, Nashville, Tennessee – recording location

Charts

Year-end charts

Radio singles

References

1989 albums
White Heart albums
Albums produced by Brown Bannister